TVGC may refer to:
TV Guide Channel, an American cable channel
TV Games Computer, an early microcomputer